The 2012 ADAC Procar Series season was the eighteenth season of the ADAC Procar Series, the German championship for Super 2000 touring cars. The season consisted of eight separate race weekends with two races each, spread over seven different tracks.

Teams and drivers

Race calendar and results

Championship standings

Drivers' Championship

Teams' Championship

References

External links
 Official ADAC Procar Series website

ADAC Procar Series
ADAC Procar Series seasons